J Street is a nonprofit liberal advocacy group based in the United States whose stated aim is to promote American leadership to end the Arab–Israeli and Israeli–Palestinian conflicts peacefully and diplomatically. J Street was incorporated on November 29, 2007.

According to J Street, its political action committee, the J Street PAC, is "the first and only federal Political Action Committee whose goal is to demonstrate that there is meaningful political and financial support to candidates for federal office from large numbers of Americans who believe a new direction in American policy will advance U.S. interests in the Middle East and promote real peace and security for Israel and the region".

J Street describes itself as "the political home for pro-Israel, pro-peace Americans who want Israel to be secure, democratic and the national home of the Jewish people ... advocat[ing] policies that advance shared US and Israeli interests as well as Jewish and democratic values, leading to a two-state solution to the Israeli-Palestinian conflict". Critics from the right allege that J Street and the policies they support are anti-Israel.

Etymology
J Street, as an American lobby organization aimed at Washington leaders and policymakers, derived its name from the alphabetically named street plan of Washington, D.C.: J Street is missing from the grid (the street naming jumps from I Street to K Street since I and J were not yet considered to be distinct letters at the time the Washington street plan was created). Also, by association, the letter J is a reference to "Jewish". Further, K Street is a street in downtown Washington on which many influential lobbying firms are located, and that become synonymous for Washington's formidable lobbying establishment. Consequently, the choice of the name reflects the desire of J Street's founders and donors to bring a message to Washington that, metaphorically like the missing "J Street" of the D.C. grid, has thus far been absent.

Political vision
J Street's stated aim is to provide a political home for pro-Israel, pro-peace Americans who believe that a "two-state solution to the Israeli-Palestinian conflict is essential to Israel's survival as the national home of the Jewish people and as a vibrant democracy". J Street has a two-fold mission: first, to advocate for urgent American diplomatic leadership to achieve a two-state solution and a broader regional, comprehensive peace and, second, to ensure a broad debate on Israel and the Middle East in national politics and the American Jewish community. In 2011, J Street opposed recognizing Palestine as an independent state at the United Nations.

J Street "recognizes and supports Israel as the homeland of the Jewish people" and Israel's "desire for security as the Jewish homeland, as well as the right of the Palestinians to a sovereign state of their own". According to its executive director, Jeremy Ben-Ami, J Street is neither pro- nor anti- any individual organization or other pro-Israel umbrella groups like the American Israel Public Affairs Committee (AIPAC). He says J Street is proud of AIPAC's many accomplishments and clarified that the two groups have different priorities rather than different views.

Explaining the need for a new advocacy and lobbying group, Ben-Ami stated: "J Street has been started, however, because there has not been sufficient vocal and political advocacy on behalf of the view that Israel's interests will be best served when the United States makes it a major foreign policy priority to help Israel achieve a real and lasting peace not only with the Palestinians but with all its neighbors."

Alan Solomont, one of the founders of J Street and a former national finance chair of the Democratic National Committee (DNC) and currently a Democratic Party fundraiser, described the need for J Street in the following way:
"We have heard the voices of neocons, and right-of-center Jewish leaders and Christian evangelicals, and the mainstream views of the American Jewish community have not been heard." During its first conference, Ben-Ami said, "The party and the viewpoint that we're closest to in Israeli politics is actually Kadima." Kadima MK Meir Sheetrit, who attended the conference, said, "They are more left than Kadima, but on this main issue, which is peace, I think we agree."

The Washington Post described the perceived differences between J Street and AIPAC: "While both groups call themselves bipartisan, AIPAC has won support from an overwhelming majority of Republican Jews, while J Street is presenting itself as an alternative for Democrats who have grown uncomfortable with both Netanyahu's policies and the conservatives' flocking to AIPAC."

J Street endorsed the nuclear disarmament deal with Iran, which Obama supported and Netanyahu and AIPAC opposed. In 2016 the political focus of J Street was to unseat Republican senators who led U.S. Congressional opposition to the Iran deal. When The Forward solicited opinions of the completed Iran deal from American Jewish organizations, some were critical, but J Street stated: "For the first time in nearly a decade, Iran does not have the nuclear material needed to build even a single bomb. That makes Americans, Israelis and the Iranian people themselves immeasurably safer. ... That Iran has completed these steps—and granted international inspectors the unprecedented access necessary to verify and continuously monitor compliance on an ongoing basis—in an unexpectedly short period of time is further proof of the power of tough, effective diplomacy in addressing some of our most serious security concerns."

Structure

J Street and J Street PAC, founded in April 2008, exist as separate legal entities with different political functions. The J Street Education Fund joined the J Street family of organizations in 2009:

 J Street – a nonprofit advocacy group registered as a 501(c)(4) social welfare group. J Street aims to encourage and "support strong American leadership to end the Arab-Israeli and Palestinian-Israeli conflicts peacefully and diplomatically".
 The J Street PAC – a political action committee capable of making direct political campaign donations. Thus, the J Street PAC will provide political and financial support to candidates who are seeking election or reelection and agree with J Street's goals.
 The J Street Education Fund, Inc. – a 501(c)(3) charitable organization. It aims to educate targeted communities about the need for a two-state solution to the Israeli-Palestinian conflict, raise the visibility of a mainstream pro-Israel, pro-peace presence within the American Jewish community, and promote open, dynamic and spirited conversation about how to best advance the interests and future of a democratic, Jewish Israel. J Street Local, J Street's national field program and J Street U (formerly Union of Progressive Zionists), J Street's on campus movement are programs of the J Street Education Fund.
 J Street U – the student organizing arm of J Street, organizing chapters on university and college campuses.

Management
J Street's founding Executive Director is Jeremy Ben-Ami, a former domestic policy adviser in the Clinton Administration. Ben-Ami's grandparents were among the founders of Tel Aviv, his parents were Israelis, his family suffered in the Holocaust, and he has lived in Israel, where he was almost killed in a Jerusalem terror attack. Ben-Ami has worked for many years with Jewish peace groups, including the Center for Middle East Peace and the Geneva Accord.

Advisory council
J Street's advisory council consists of former public officials, policy experts, community leaders and academics, including Daniel Levy, a former high-ranking Israeli official who was the lead drafter of the groundbreaking Geneva Initiative, Franklin Fisher and Debra DeLee of Americans for Peace Now, Marcia Freedman of Brit Tzedek v'Shalom, Democratic Middle East foreign policy expert Robert Malley, former Israeli foreign minister Shlomo Ben-Ami, former U.S. Ambassador to Israel Samuel W. Lewis, former Rhode Island Governor and Republican U.S. Senator Lincoln Chafee. and Hannah Rosenthal, former head of the Office to Monitor and Combat Anti-Semitism.

Rabbinic cabinet
J Street's rabbinic cabinet consists of North American rabbis, cantors and cantorial students. The group is co-chaired by Rabbis John Rosove (Senior Rabbi of Temple Israel of Hollywood) and John Friedman (rabbi of Judea Reform Congregation in Durham, North Carolina).

Activities

Political fund raising
The J Street PAC acts as a traditional political action committee raising funds to support a limited number of candidates for Senate and Congressional races.

For the 2008 Congressional elections, the J Street PAC raised $600,000 and, according to J Street, 33 of the 41 candidates it backed won their seats.

In 2010, J Street PAC endorsed 61 candidates — 3 for the Senate and 58 for the House. 45 of the PAC's candidates won. The J Street PAC distributed over $1.5 million to its candidates, more than any other pro-Israel PAC in the two-year cycle.

In the 2014 election cycle, J Street PAC contributed over $2.4 million to its 95 endorsed candidates, the most in history by a pro-Israel PAC.

In the 2016 election cycle, J Street PAC distributed $3.6 million to its 124 endorsed candidates, and not a single incumbent Iran deal supporter was unseated by a deal detractor.

Critics have pointed out that according to Federal Election Commission filings in 2009, dozens of Arab and Muslim Americans and Iranian advocacy organizations donated tens of thousands of dollars to J Street, representing "a small fraction" of the group's fund-raising. Donors included Lebanese-American businessman Richard Abdoo, who is a board member of Amideast and a former board member of the Arab American Institute, and Genevieve Lynch, who is also a member of the National Iranian American Council board. In response, Ben-Ami noted that J Street does not impose a religious or ethnic test to donations. "It would be a very big mistake for pro-Israel organizations to apply a religious or ethnic litmus test for support for Israel from other Americans. I don't think anybody checked to see whether [Pastor] John Hagee was Jewish before he was invited to keynote the AIPAC conference," he said. "I don't think we should be banning Christians, I don't think we should be banning Muslims, I don't think we should be banning Arabs from finding a way to support Israel, to support its right to exist and to support a program that is designed to secure the future." Abraham Foxman of the Anti-Defamation League noted that the ADL also receives donations from non-Jews and does not apply a religious test to donors. More than 20% of the citizens of Israel are Arab, most of whom are Muslim.

Lobbying
J Street lobbies for and against Israel-related bills and legislation.

J Street's first-year budget for fiscal 2009 was $1.5 million. This is a modest figure for a PAC, though Gary Kamiya writes that J Street hopes to raise significant money online, following the blueprint of MoveOn and the Barack Obama presidential campaign.

Other projects and activities
In May 2012, a J Street delegation visited with Palestinian Authority president Mahmoud Abbas, headed by Executive Director Jeremy Ben-Ami.

J Street started a special website and project, They Don't Speak For Us. It criticizes the Emergency Committee for Israel, a right-wing advocacy group that William Kristol and Gary Bauer, inspired by J Street, created. "They Don't Speak For Us" describes the ECI as "just plain out of touch" and "far outside the mainstream" of the pro-Israel Jewish community.

In November 2012, J Street lobbied the U.S. Senate against a group of bills that would have penalized the Palestinian National Authority if it used its recently elevated status of "observer" at the United Nations to bring international charges against Israel. J Street supporters made 1000 telephone calls and sent 15,000 e-mail messages against the bills, which failed to pass.

In July 2010 J Street supported the construction of the Cordoba House cultural center and mosque near the World Trade Center site in New York. President Jeremy Ben-Ami released a statement saying:

Relationship with Israeli and U.S. governments
According to Nathan Guttman, "J Street and its supporters have never made a secret of their opposition to Netanyahu and his policies." On October 22, 2009, then–opposition leader of the Knesset, Tzipi Livni, sent a letter congratulating J Street on its inaugural event. She said she would not be able to attend but that Kadima would be "well represented" by Meir Sheetrit, Shlomo Molla, and Haim Ramon.

The Israeli Embassy stated that Ambassador Michael Oren would not attend J Street's first national conference because J Street supports positions that may "impair" Israel's interest. Oren continued his criticism after the conference, telling Conservative rabbis meeting in Philadelphia that J Street "is a unique problem in that it not only opposes one policy of one Israeli government, it opposes all policies of all Israeli governments. It's significantly out of the mainstream." Hannah Rosenthal, head of the Office to Monitor and Combat Anti-Semitism in the Obama Administration, criticized Oren, saying his comments were "most unfortunate". After several American Jewish groups criticized Rosenthal, the U.S. State Department said that "Rosenthal has the complete support of the department." In April 2010, Oren had a meeting with J Street Executive Director Jeremy Ben-Ami to discuss the issues. After leaving his role as Israeli ambassador to the U.S. and campaigning for an MK position in the Knesset, Oren described his view as follows: "We have to understand that people who aren't anti-Israel have criticisms of specific Israeli policies. We have to show greater flexibility on the peace issue. Israel is willing to go a serious distance on peace."

In February 2010 the Israeli Foreign Ministry refused to meet with visiting U.S. congressmembers being escorted by J Street on a visit to Israel unless members of Congress attended the meeting without their J Street escorts. Addressing the Conference of Presidents of Major American Jewish Organizations, Deputy Foreign Minister Ayalon said "The thing that troubles me is that they don't present themselves as to what they really are. They should not call themselves pro-Israeli." In Haaretz, columnist Bradley Burston wrote that the Foreign Ministry's refusal to meet with the U.S. congressmembers was "a gratuitous move breathtaking in its haughtiness, its ignorance of and disrespect for the United States and the American Jewish community". He said that the Foreign Ministry considered J Street "guilty of the crime of explicitly calling itself pro-Israel, while not agreeing wholeheartedly with everything the government of Israel says and does". Haviv Rettig Gur, writing in The Jerusalem Post, said that "J Street won a small victory" in the incident. "If American legislators with pro-Israel records say J Street is kosher", Gur wrote, "that creates a new political reality with which the Israeli Right must contend."

The Foreign Ministry said J Street's assertions that Ayalon refused to meet with members of the U.S. Congress and that he later apologized were untrue, and that they were a fund-raising publicity stunt and a "premeditated public relations circus". Barukh Binah, Foreign Ministry deputy director-general and head of its North America Division said that Ayalon did not prevent any meetings between the J Street group and Israeli high officials and that Ayalon was never on the delegation's schedule. J Street said its information was based on news reports in Yedioth Ahronoth and Maariv.

During a panel organized by the Knesset Immigration, Absorption and Public Diplomacy Committee, MK Danny Danon (Likud) and MK Otniel Schneller (Kadima) argued that J Street was not a pro-Israel organization, and proposed a statement to that effect which did not pass. Jeffrey Goldberg at The Atlantic described Israeli Prime Minister Benjamin Netanyahu's repeated refusal to meet with representatives of J Street as a "farce" and added: "He should argue with J Street, yell at J Street, grapple with J Street, but most of all meet with J Street. Those Israelis, and those American Jews, who believe that J Street, and the spirit it represents, are fleeting phenomena have absolutely no idea what is happening in the Jewish world.

In May 2013, Yedioth Ahronoth reported that the Israeli government appears to be building closer ties to J Street, with a group of J Street representatives scheduled to meet, for the first time, members of the government, including President Shimon Peres.

On March 17, 2015, Netanyahu won a resounding victory in Israeli elections. His denial of a two state solution happening on his watch and comments he made that are considered by some to be "racist" motivated J Street at its convention to make clear its opposition to the occupation, opposition to BDS, opposition to American Jewish support of Jewish settlements in the West Bank and to efforts by organizations like Hillel to limit the discussion on Israel and the peace process. Liberal Knesset Member Stav Shaffir encouraged J Street to hone the message of the pro-peace camp in Israel as well as the U.S., and she "brought the crowd to its feet repeatedly as she described the battle ahead for a two-state solution". J Street followed Obama's lead in considering international alternatives to direct negotiations between the Israeli government and Palestinians.

In February 2017, The New York Times reported that David Friedman, U.S. President Donald Trump's pick to be Ambassador to Israel, would formally apologize for previously labeling supporters of J Street as "worse than kapos" during his conformation hearing. J Street urged those who oppose Friedman's appointment to write to their senators and reject his nomination, and alongside a number of progressive organizations collected more than 600 signatures from American rabbis and cantors who opposed Friedman's appointment.

Funding
Confidential IRS documents obtained by The Washington Times in 2010 showed that George Soros had been a donor to J Street since 2008. The approximately $750,000 from Soros and his family, together with donations from Hong Kong-based businesswoman Ms. Consolacion Esdicul, amounted to about 15% of J Street's funding in its early years. In previous statements and on its web site J Street had seemed to deny receiving support from foreign interests and from Soros, a bête noire to conservatives. Jeremy Ben-Ami apologized for earlier "misleading" statements regarding funding from Soros. Ben-Ami also clarified that donors to 501(c)(4) organizations are promised confidentiality by law and challenged critics to make public the contributors to opposing organizations. Rabbi Steve Gutow, a president of the Jewish Council for Public Affairs, called J Street "irresponsible" for its handling of the issue.

Reception
In March 2015 The Forward said of J Street: "There's no doubt that J Street has shaken up American Jewry. Since its inception in 2008 as a lobby, political action committee, educational group and student movement, the organization has disrupted the debate about what it means to be pro-Israel." NPR's Mara Liasson reported from the J Street conference that took place shortly after Israel's March 17, 2015 elections, in which Israeli Prime Minister Benjamin Netanyahu promised voters there would be no Palestinian state on his watch. Noting the American Jewish community was as divided as the Israeli voters, Liasson described J Street's role in American Jewish dialog on Israel: "In the debate now raging in the Jewish community in the United States, J Street is the pro-two-state group and anti-Netanyahu, pro-nuclear-deal and generally much more supportive of Obama than AIPAC is."

At its beginning, J Street's role in American Jewish dialog was debated. When J Street was initially founded, Israeli-American writer and analyst Gershom Gorenberg wrote in the American Prospect that J Street "might change not only the political map in Washington but the actual map in the Middle East". Noah Pollak at Commentary predicted that the effort would fall flat and show there are no "great battalions of American Jewish doves languishing in voicelessness".

Ken Wald, a political scientist at University of Florida, predicted the group would be attacked by the "Jewish right". According to BBC News, Wald warned that J Street would "get hammered and accused of being anti-Israel. A lot will have to do with the way they actually frame their arguments."

James Kirchick, writing in The New Republic, called J Street's labeling of AIPAC as "right wing" "ridiculous"; Kirchick says that AIPAC's former president told him that AIPAC was the first American Jewish organization to support Oslo and supports a two-state solution. Kirchick further asserts that some of J Street's positions, such as advocating negotiations with Hamas, are not popular with most American Jews. According to a March 2008 Haaretz-Dialog poll the majority of Israelis do support direct talks with Hamas, although this referred solely to the issue of kidnapped Israeli soldier Gilad Shalit. Jeremy Ben-Ami responded to Kirchick's charges during a May 26, 2008, interview published in Haaretz Magazine. Kirchick also reacted against J Streets endorsement of the play Seven Jewish Children, which many critics consider antisemitic. "To J Street, the inflammatory message of Seven Jewish Children is precisely what makes it worthy of production," he charges.

Rabbi Eric Yoffie, president of the Union for Reform Judaism, called J Street's reaction to the Israeli invasion of Gaza "morally deficient, profoundly out of touch with Jewish sentiment and also appallingly naïve". J Street responded stating, "It is hard for us to understand how the leading reform rabbi in North America could call our effort to articulate a nuanced view on these difficult issues 'morally deficient'. If our views are 'naive' and 'morally deficient', then so are the views of scores of Israeli journalists, security analysts, distinguished authors, and retired IDF officers who have posed the same questions about the Gaza attack as we have." Despite this rebuttal, J Street subsequently invited Yoffie to its 2009 convention, and he subsequently praised the organization's stance on the 2014 Israel–Gaza conflict, which was closer to that of other American Jewish organizations.

In April 2009, The Washington Post called J Street "Washington's leading pro-Israel PAC", citing the group's impressive fund raising efforts in its first year and its record of electoral success, including 33 victories by J Street-supported candidates for Congress.

According to Caroline Glick, deputy managing editor of The Jerusalem Post, J Street is anything but pro-Israel: "Through their actions, J Street and its allies have made clear that their institutional interests are served by weakening Israel. Their mission is to harm Israel's standing in Washington and weaken the influence of the mainstream American Jewish community that supports Israel."

Lenny Ben-David, former director of the Israeli branch of AIPAC, said J Street hides "its real anti-Israel face behind a 'pro-Israel' mask".

Shmuel Rosner questioned whether J Street actually represents U.S. Jewry. Noah Pollak questioned the veracity of their polling. Barry Rubin suggested that J Street is an anti-Israel front for Iranian interests, masquerading as a Zionist organization.

Responding to charges made by Ben-Ami in his book, A New Voice for Israel: Fighting for the Survival of the Jewish Nation, that he and others have stifled critical debate within the Jewish community, political commentator Alan Dershowitz said, "It is a fraud in advertising to call J Street pro-Israel." In addition, Dershowitz said that "J Street has done more damage to Israel than any [other] American organization." In response to Dershowitz's comments, J Street's director of government affairs, Dylan Williams, stated that "Alan Dershowitz's comments provide ample evidence of the self-censorship of the American Jewish community from within concerning the real dangers facing Israel."

Dershowitz, in June 2012, said that J Street is "completely undercutting the Obama policy" with regards to the US position on a military option against the Iranian nuclear program, since J Street has said that it opposes a military option, while both the US and Israel have said it "must be kept on the table". In addition, he said that, "absolutely no good has come from J Street's soft policy on Iran. Either J Street must change its policy, or truth in advertising requires that it no longer proclaim itself a friend of Israel, a friend of peace, a friend of truth, or a friend of the Obama administration."

In an April 2012 interview, Norman Finkelstein described J Street as the "loyal opposition" to the Israel lobby. He said the group was politically aligned with Kadima, a political party in the Knesset that opposed Israel's governing coalition. Finkelstein also said J Street's leadership was "hopeless".

Chuck Freilich, former deputy national security adviser in Israel, writing in The Jerusalem Post in February 2013, said, "J Street leads only to a dead end", since "only Israelis bear the responsibility for determining their future."

The Economist writes that many liberal Jews in America are opposed to the occupation and distressed by Israel's increasing religious nationalism. The younger generation is therefore gravitating to organizations like J Street, whose dovish members include former officials of President Clinton's and President Obama's administrations. While earlier generations of Americans saw Israel as a plucky David battling Goliath, younger Americans now see a powerful Israel occupying the West Bank. "But the existence of a mainstream Jewish group that criticizes Israeli policy has made it easier to dissent without being painted as an enemy of Israel or even anti-Semitic."

Controversy
On September 30, 2010, The Washington Times reported that J Street facilitated meetings between South African judge Richard Goldstone and members of Congress in November 2009, causing Jeremy Ben-Ami to tell The Jerusalem Post on October 1, 2010, that his staff had made "two or three" such phone calls to U.S. politicians and relayed their response onward, but that after those initial inquiries were made, his organization decided not to become involved because of Israel's attitude toward Goldstone, saying "J Street did not host, arrange or facilitate Judge Richard Goldstone's visit." It was reported that Colette Avital, former member of the Knesset from the center-left Labor Party and a J Street liaison in Israel said that one of the reasons she resigned from J Street was its connection with Goldstone. However, this was later denied by Avital herself.

On December 30, 2010, The Washington Times reported that J Street "paid tens of thousands of dollars to a consulting firm co-owned by its founder and president, Jeremy Ben-Ami". "Even if it's technically legal, it gets very messy when you have these sorts of deals going on because, if you're going to benefit on the other end of it, be it 100 percent or 5 percent, it raises questions about objectivity and the arm's length in the transaction," said Ken Berger, president of Charity Navigator. "Mr. Ben-Ami declined repeated interview requests, but provided a statement through a spokesman: 'I founded Ben-Or together with Oriella Ben-Zvi in 1998. When I left in 2000, I relinquished all rights to ongoing compensation from Ben-Or in any form. I have received no payments from the company in the past 11 years and have had no role in the management or operation of the firm.'"

In January 2011, liberal Jewish congressman Rep. Gary Ackerman, D-N.Y., cut ties with J Street over J Street's recommendation to the Obama administration not to veto a proposed U.N. resolution condemning Israel, saying "I've come to the conclusion that J Street is not an organization with which I wish to be associated." He also said, "The decision to endorse the Palestinian and Arab effort to condemn Israel in the U.N. Security Council is not the choice of a concerned friend trying to help. It is rather the befuddled choice of an organization so open-minded about what constitutes support for Israel that its brains have fallen out. America really does need a smart, credible, politically active organization that is as aggressively pro-peace as it is pro-Israel. Unfortunately, J Street ain't it." In a press release, J Street noted that it had not endorsed the resolution, was advocating policies that would keep the resolution from coming to a vote, and if that failed was urging the US to change the resolution language to be in line with US policy.

At the J Street February 2011 conference's opening speech, Rabbi David Saperstein, director and chief legal counsel at the Union for Reform Judaism's Religious Action Center for more than 30 years, said that he is "among J Street's most fervent fans", though he shared his concerns regarding J Street's recent recommendation to the Obama administration not to veto a UN Security Council resolution condemning Israel. Saperstein added, "If you alienate your mainstream support you risk losing everything."

A Jerusalem Post editorial expressed concern regarding the individuals invited to speak to the J Street February 2011 conference. They included Rebecca Vilkomerson, executive director of Jewish Voice for Peace, whom the newspaper described as an "adamant proponent" of Boycott, Divestment and Sanctions against Israel; Mustafa Barghouti, leader of the Palestinian National Initiative, described as a BDS advocate who took part in the Free Gaza Flotilla; and Michael Sfard, an attorney who, according to the newspaper, "advocates international 'lawfare' against Israel". Israeli Members of Knesset were among those who voiced concern. "I have my own criticism of the current government, but there have to be limits, and this organization is doing tremendous damage to Israel," said Kadima MK Ze'ev Bielski, a former Jewish Agency chairman. At the same time, other MKs attended and spoke at the conference, including Daniel Ben-Simon (Labor), Yoel Hasson (Kadima), Amir Peretz (Labor), Nachman Shai (Kadima), and Orit Zuaretz (Kadima).

In March 2011, MK Otniel Schneller (Kadima) said to Ben-Ami during a Knesset committee meeting: "You are not Zionists and you do not care about Israeli interests. Fifty rockets a day are fired on the South and you fight against the American veto against condemnations of Israel. You are not Zionists and you do not care about Israel. Only here in Israel do we determine Israeli democracy, and you cannot determine what Israel's interests are." Ben Ami responded by saying, "An absolute parameter has to be the recognition of the fundamental right of the Jewish people to their own state. There are plenty of people, even within the American Jewish community, who are anti-Zionist and who do not recognize that right. Second, they must recognize Israel's right to defend itself against threats – Israel must be strong, because it lives in a hard neighborhood, as we've even seen this morning."

In November 2011 J Street board member Kathleen Peratis visited with Hamas in the Gaza Strip. The meeting was controversial in the pro-Israel community. J Street opposed it ahead of time and condemned it afterward.

In July 2012, J Street launched an ad campaign against two U.S. Representatives and Tea Party activists who opposed the creation of a Palestinian state, Joe Walsh (R-IL) and Allen West (R-FL). In response, West said that "J Street's efforts to attack me only embolden my stand for our greatest ally and my spiritual home, the State of Israel." Walsh's chief of staff commented that "If J Street is attacking you, you know you're doing something right." Both representatives were defeated in the general election.

J Street has clashed with rival pro-Israel group StandWithUs, which claims that J Street is too close to funders and advisers who have "opposed Israel" and Arab governments perceived as "consistently hostile to Israel". In response, Jeremy Ben-Ami accused StandWithUs of smear tactics against J Street and having an "us versus them, good versus evil, black versus white" world view towards the ongoing Arab-Israeli conflict.

See also
 Conference of Presidents of Major American Jewish Organizations
 Diaspora politics in the United States
 Jewish lobby
 Jewish Agency
 Independent Jewish Voices
 Brit Tzedek v'Shalom
 Americans for Peace Now
 Jewish Voice for Peace
 Partners for Progressive Israel
 Israel Policy Forum
 Republican Jewish Coalition
 White House Jewish Liaison
 National Jewish Democratic Council
 JCall – European-based advocacy
 Yachad (NGO) - UK-based organisation

References

Further reading

 Lichblau, Eric. "J Street, a Lobbying Group, Is Being Heard as Moderate Voice on Israel", The New York Times, May 30, 2012.
 Kirsch, Jonathan. "The J Street Zionist", The Jewish Journal of Greater Los Angeles, November 17, 2011.
 Hoffman, Allison. "Heads Up: J Street chief Jeremy Ben-Ami calls the plays for the first self-confident alternative Jewish establishment", Tablet Magazine, October 28, 2010.
 Kirchick, James. "The Fork in J Street: Will the new Israel lobby disavow its extreme left flank?", The New Republic, October 31, 2009.
 Goldberg, Jeffrey. "J Street's Ben-Ami on Zionism and Military Aid to Israel", The Atlantic, October 23, 2009.
 Traub, James. "The New Israel Lobby" The New York Times, September 13, 2009
 Guttman, Nathan. "J Street Makes a Strategic Acquisition", The Forward, September 4, 2009
 Guttman, Nathan. "J Street Shows Its Strength In Numbers", The Forward, November 13, 2008

 Ephron, Dan. "A Firmer Hand: Washington's new Jewish lobby presses Israel" Newsweek, May 27, 2008
 Ben-Ami, Jeremy. "5 Myths on Who's Really 'Pro-Israel'" The Washington Post, May 8, 2008
 Lichfield, Gideon. "Hurdles on J Street" Prospect (UK), April 30, 2008
 Rozen, Laura. "J Street Hopes to Prod Washington MidEast Policy Towards Center" Mother Jones blog, April 15, 2008

External links

 
 J Street PAC

501(c)(4) nonprofit organizations
Charities based in Washington, D.C.
Israeli–Palestinian peace process
Israel–United States relations
Jewish-American political organizations
Jewish anti-occupation groups
Non-governmental organizations involved in the Israeli–Palestinian conflict
Organizations established in 2007
Political organizations based in the United States
Zionism in the United States
Pro-Israel political advocacy groups in the United States